The Cape Lookout Coast Guard Station is located on the Core Banks of North Carolina between Cape Lookout and the Cape Lookout Light. The station was built as a lifeboat station beginning in 1916 and comprises a complex of several frame buildings.  The chief structure is the Main Station, a neo-colonial building with a central cupola or watchtower. It is surrounded by a galley, or messhall, equipment buildings, cisterns and similar support structures. Two similar stations were built at Hatteras Inlet and Cape Fear, which have not survived. The Cape Lookout station was chiefly responsible for providing rescue services in the Cape Lookout Shoals, which extend ten miles into the Atlantic Ocean and represent a significant hazard to coastwise shipping. The Cape Lookout station operated until 1982, and is now under the care of Cape Lookout National Seashore.

The Station's two original buildings now regularly house students from North Carolina Universities assisting in dolphin  and sea turtle research. The buildings  are run by a single windmill and two solar panel arrays.

It was listed on the National Register of Historic Places in 1989.

Gallery

References

Government buildings on the National Register of Historic Places in North Carolina
Government buildings completed in 1916
Buildings and structures in Carteret County, North Carolina
Closed facilities of the United States Coast Guard
National Register of Historic Places in Carteret County, North Carolina
Historic districts on the National Register of Historic Places in North Carolina